The Letov Š-18 was a Czechoslovak single-engined, two-seat biplane trainer. It was designed by Alois Smolík at Letov Kbely. The Š-18 first flew in 1925.

The aircraft was quite successful and sold well, both to private pilots and to flying clubs. Apart from the basic variant, there was also still the type Š-118, which was equipped with a Walter NZ-85 engine (85 hp, 63 KW). Some machines were exported to Bulgaria. The Czechoslovakian Air Force used the type 1925 to 1930 as a beginner trainer aircraft.

A complete reconstruction of the fuselage led to the Š-218, which had a steel tube frame and was equipped with a  Walter NZ-120 engine. The first flight of this type took place in 1926.

In 1929, one Š-218 Smolik was presented at Helsinki International Air Show. The Finnish Air Force showed interest in the type and purchased it in March 1930. Nine more were soon ordered along with the manufacturing license. The nine aircraft ordered from Czechoslovakia arrived at Finland in June–July 1931. The Finnish State Aircraft Factory manufactured 29 slightly modified aircraft in three series. The first ten (powered by  Walter Mars engines) were ready in 1933, the second series of ten aircraft (powered by  Walter Gemma engines) were ready in 1935, and nine more (powered by  Bramo Sh 14) were in 1936. The Finnish version could develop a maximum speed of 155 km/h (83 knots, 96 mph). The type was in service with the Finnish Air Force as a primary trainer between 1930 - 1945. One aircraft is still preserved at the Finnish Aviation Museum in Vantaa and one replica is being built in Finland (as of 2005).

Versions
Letov Š-18 Walter NZ-60
Letov Š-118 Walter NZ-85
Letov Š-218 Walter NZ-120 or Bramo (Finnish production)

Operators
 
Bulgarian Air Force

Czechoslovakian Air Force

Finnish Air Force 39 aircraft

Specifications (Š-218 Smolik)

References

Bibliography

 

1920s Czechoslovakian military trainer aircraft
Š-18
Biplanes
Aircraft first flown in 1925
Single-engined tractor aircraft